Insomnia is a 2002 American psychological thriller film directed by Christopher Nolan and written by Hillary Seitz. A remake of the 1997 Norwegian film of the same name, it stars Al Pacino, Robin Williams and Hilary Swank with Maura Tierney, Martin Donovan, Nicky Katt and Paul Dooley in supporting roles. The film begins with two Los Angeles homicide detectives investigating a murder in Nightmute, Alaska. After the killer witnesses an accident done by one of the detectives, they create a plan for both parties to mutually avoid prosecution.

Released on May 24, 2002, Insomnia grossed more than $113 million worldwide against a production budget of $46 million, and received critical praise, including for Pacino's and Williams' performances. It is the only film by Nolan that he did not write or co-write.

Plot
In the small fishing town of Nightmute, Alaska, 17-year-old Kay Connell is found murdered. Los Angeles Police Department (LAPD) detectives Will Dormer and Hap Eckhart are sent to assist the local police with their investigation. They do so at the request of police chief Nyback, an old colleague of Dormer. Ellie Burr, a young, local detective who is also a fan of Dormer's investigative work, picks them up when they arrive.

Back in Los Angeles, Internal Affairs is investigating one of Dormer's past cases. While in the restaurant of their hotel, Eckhart reveals that he is going to testify against Dormer in exchange for immunity. Dormer responds by noting that many criminals whom he helped to convict using questionable evidence could go free if their cases are reopened.

Dormer cleverly attracts the murderer to the scene of the crime, but the suspect flees into the fog, shooting one of the police officers through the leg. Dormer spots a figure in the fog and fires with his backup weapon when his primary jams. Rushing to the fallen figure, Dormer picks up a .38 pistol the suspect has dropped. He then discovers that he has shot Eckhart. Eckhart recognizes him, and dies believing Dormer shot him on purpose.

Because of Eckhart's pending testimony, Dormer knows that Internal Affairs will never believe the shooting was an accident, so he claims that Eckhart was shot by the suspect. He does not mention that he has the .38 pistol. Burr is put in charge of the shooting investigation, and her team finds the .38 caliber bullet that hit the officer. That night, Dormer walks to an alley and fires the .38 pistol into an animal carcass, then retrieves and cleans the bullet. At the morgue, the pathologist hands him the bagged bullet retrieved from Eckhart's body, but she is unfamiliar with its type. Dormer leaves and switches the .38 bullet for the 9 mm slug from Eckhart's body.

Over the next few days, Dormer is plagued by insomnia, brought on by his guilt over killing Eckhart and exacerbated by the perpetual daylight. Dormer starts receiving anonymous phone calls from the killer, who claims to have witnessed Dormer kill his partner. When the police learn that Kay was a fan of local crime writer Walter Finch, Dormer breaks into Finch's apartment in the nearby village of Umkumiut. Finch arrives at home, realizes the police are present, and evades Dormer after a chase. Dormer returns to Finch's apartment and plants the .38 to frame Finch.

Finch contacts Dormer and arranges a meeting on a ferry. Finch wants help in shifting suspicion to Kay's abusive boyfriend Randy Stetz and in return will stay silent about the Eckhart shooting. Dormer gives advice on handling police questioning. After Finch leaves Dormer on the ferry, he shows the detective a tape recorder he used to record the conversation.

Finch calls Dormer and tells him that Kay's death was "an accident"; he beat her to death in a fit of rage after she laughed at his sexual advances. The next day, Finch gives false testimony at the police station. When Finch claims Randy has a gun, Dormer realizes Finch has discovered his plant and has hidden it at Randy's home. Randy is arrested when the gun is found at his house. Finch asks Burr to come to his lake house the next day to collect letters indicating that Randy abused Kay.

Burr returns to the scene of Eckhart's death and finds a 9 mm shell casing, which conflicts with the bullet type from Eckhart's body. She reads her own case study from an investigation Dormer was involved in and learns he has carried a 9 mm, leading her to suspect that he shot Eckhart. Meanwhile, on his last night staying in the hotel, Dormer confides in the hotel owner, Rachel Clement, about the Internal Affairs investigation: He fabricated evidence to help convict a pedophile he was certain was guilty of murdering a child and who would have walked if Eckhart had testified.

Dormer learns that Burr has gone to Finch's. He finds Kay's letters in Finch's apartment and realizes that Finch intends to kill Burr. He learns of Finch's lake house and rushes there. At the house, Finch knocks Burr unconscious just as Dormer arrives, and takes Burr's gun. Dormer is too disoriented from lack of sleep to fight off Finch. Burr revives and saves Dormer, while Finch escapes. Burr reveals she knows Dormer shot Eckhart, and he admits that he is no longer certain if it was an accident. From his shed, Finch shoots at them with a shotgun, and Burr returns fire with Dormer's gun while Dormer sneaks around to Finch's location. After a scuffle in which Dormer grabs Finch's shotgun, Finch shoots Dormer with Burr's gun, and Dormer shoots and kills Finch with the shotgun.

Burr rushes to the fatally wounded Dormer and comforts him by affirming that Eckhart's shooting was accidental, then moves to throw away the 9 mm shell casing to preserve Dormer's reputation. Dormer stops her, however, urging her not to lose her integrity as he had. Dormer says his last words "just let me sleep" and dies just as Burr puts the bullet back in the evidence bag.

Cast

Production

Jonathan Demme was originally attached to direct the film and considered Harrison Ford for the role of Will Dormer.

Casting
Insomnia has Robin Williams playing a villain, deviating from the comedic roles for which  he was earlier known. Regarding his decision to cast Williams, Nolan said: "I think [audiences] will come away feeling like they have seen a 'new' Robin Williams. Seeing Robin Williams doing something they would have never imagined that he would or could do."

Nolan on Williams's acting:

Filming

Insomnia was filmed over a three-month period from April to June 2001. The opening aerial scene was filmed over the Columbia Glacier near Valdez, Alaska and the float plane approach was over the Portland Canal near Hyder, Alaska, and Stewart, British Columbia. The town of Nightmute, Alaska, was primarily filmed in/around Squamish, British Columbia, including the hotel/lodge, police station, high school, and the funeral cemetery scene. The scene where Will Dormer shoots his partner on the rocky beach in the fog was filmed at Clementine Creek in Indian Arm, outside of Vancouver. The village of Umkumuit, where Finch's apartment is located and where the log chase scene occurs, was filmed on Vancouver Island in Port Alberni. The waterfall road scene where Dormer is on his way to Finch's lake house and spins his car 180° was shot in front of Bridal Veil Falls on the Richardson Highway near Valdez, Alaska. The final scene of the movie on the fictional Lake Kgun at Finch's lake house was filmed on the northwest end of Strohn Lake in Bear Glacier Provincial Park, just outside of Stewart, British Columbia. For this final scene, the film crew constructed Finch's lake house and dock from scratch and then disassembled and removed it after filming was completed in late June 2001.

Reception
On review aggregator Rotten Tomatoes, the film holds an approval rating of 92% based on 200 reviews, with an average rating of 7.70/10. The site's critical consensus reads: "Driven by Pacino's performance, Insomnia is a smart and riveting psychological drama". On Metacritic, the film holds a weighted average score of 78 out of 100, based on 37 critics, indicating "generally favorable reviews". Audiences polled by CinemaScore gave the film an average grade of "B" on an A+ to F scale.

Lou Lumenick of the New York Post gave the film an enthusiastic review, calling it a "four-course gourmet alternative to summer popcorn flicks, serving up the meatiest performances Al Pacino and Robin Williams have given in many years." Roger Ebert of the Chicago Sun-Times said that "Unlike most remakes, the Nolan Insomnia is not a pale retread, but a re-examination of the material, like a new production of a good play."

Erik Skjoldbjærg, the director of the original film, said of Nolan's reinterpretation: 

Taste of Cinema complimented Nolan for being able to "capture the excitement of the original while still setting it apart as a notable film itself." IndieWire included Insomnia in their "10 Remakes of Classics by Great Auteurs" list, writing, "Nolan shifts the moral ground from the snowballing moral corruption of the original to shades of guilt and accountability and Pacino's increasingly bleary and hallucinatory perspective becomes an evocative metaphor for his struggle."

Novelization

Robert Westbrook adapted the screenplay to novel form, which was published by Onyx in May 2002.

References

External links

 
 
 
 

2002 films
2002 psychological thriller films
Alcon Entertainment films
American police detective films
American psychological thriller films
American remakes of Norwegian films
Fictional portrayals of the Los Angeles Police Department
Films directed by Christopher Nolan
Films scored by David Julyan
Films set in Alaska
Films shot in Alaska
Films shot in Vancouver
Insomnia in film
Warner Bros. films
Films distributed by Disney
2000s English-language films
2000s American films